Boyarskoye is a rural locality (a village) in Chuchkovskoye Rural Settlement, Sokolsky District, Vologda Oblast, Russia. The population was 15 as of 2002.

Geography 
Boyarskoye is located 74 km northeast of Sokol (the district's administrative centre) by road. Prudovka is the nearest rural locality.

References 

Rural localities in Sokolsky District, Vologda Oblast